The Yakovlev Yak-152 is a Russian primary trainer aircraft from the Yakovlev Design Bureau, part of the Irkut Corporation. The aircraft has been ordered by the Russian Air Force to replace its current Yakovlev Yak-52 trainers.

Development
In 2018, after two years of flight tests, the German RED engine selection is questioned as relations between Moscow and the West are chilling. Russian alternatives, like the VMZ M-9F piston or Klimov VK-800 turboshaft engines, would require large adaptations.

Future operators

 Russian Air Force – 150 on order

Specifications (Yak-152)

See also
 Yakovlev Yak-130

References

External links
 Yak-152 official website 
 Maiden flight of the Yak-152
 Manufacturer's presentation

2010s Russian military trainer aircraft
Yakovlev aircraft
Low-wing aircraft
Single-engined tractor aircraft
Aircraft first flown in 2016